Tynommatidae is a family of millipedes in the  order Callipodida. There are about 12 genera and more than 30 described species in Tynommatidae, found mainly in western North America.

Tynommatidae was formerly considered a subfamily (Tynommatinae) of Schizopetalidae, but has been elevated in rank to family, and includes North American millipedes from the family Schizopetalidae.

Genera
These 12 genera belong to the family Tynommatidae:

 Aspidiophon Shelley, 2000
 Caliactis Shelley, 1996
 Colactis Loomis, 1937
 Colactoides Shelley, 1997
 Diactis Loomis, 1937
 Etiron Chamberlin, 1941
 Florea Shelley, 1996
 Heptium Loomis, 1937
 Idrionaria Shelley, 1996
 Mexicopetalum Stoev & Shelley, 2009
 Texophon Chamberlin, 1946
 Tynomma Loomis, 1937

References

Further reading

 
 
 
 
 

Callipodida
Millipedes of North America
Millipede families